Cytidia salicina commonly known as Scarlet Splash  is a species of Fungus that is found growing on willows and other deciduous woody plants in Europe. The spores are 12-18x4-5 um.

References

External links

Corticiales